Nowa Biała  is a village in the administrative district of Gmina Nowy Targ, within Nowy Targ County, Lesser Poland Voivodeship, in southern Poland.

The village is in Central European Time, or UTC +1 and has a population of 1,300.

It is one of the 14 villages in the Polish part of the historical region of Spiš (Polish: Spisz) and the only one of them lying on the left bank of the Białka river, owing to translocation of the stream in the past.

References

Villages in Nowy Targ County
Spiš
Kraków Voivodeship (1919–1939)